Thomas or Tom Clarke may refer to:

Politicians
 Thomas Clarke (died 1754) (c. 1672–1754), British lawyer and politician, MP for Hertford
 Thomas Clarke (Australian politician) (1846–1922), member of the New South Wales Legislative Assembly
 Tom Clarke (politician) (born 1941), British Member of Parliament 1982–2015
 Tom Clarke (Irish republican) (1858–1916)

Musicians
 Tom Clarke (musician) (born 1986), lead singer of the Enemy
 Tom "Sparkles*" Clarke (born 1988), lead singer of Area 11

Religious figures
 Thomas Clarke (Dean of Barbados) (died 1900), British colonial Anglican priest
 Thomas Clarke (Archdeacon of Macclesfield) (1907–1965), British Anglican priest in the third quarter of the 20th century

Sportspeople
 T.B.A. Clarke (Thomas Bishop Andrews Clarke, 1868–1909), English footballer
 Tom Clarke (Australian footballer) (1906–1981), Australian rules footballer who played for Essendon
 Thomas Clarke (skeleton racer) (1911–1969), British skeleton racer
 Tom Clarke (footballer, born 1987), currently with Fleetwood Town
 Thomas Clarke (footballer) (born 1989), formerly with Yeovil Town
 Thomas Clarke (cricketer) (1839–1892), Barbadian cricketer

Others
 Sir Thomas Clarke (judge) (1703–1764), English master of the rolls, 1754–1764
 Thomas Clarke (British Army officer) (died 1799)
 Thomas Curtis Clarke (1827–1901), railway engineer, builder and author
 Thomas B. Clarke (1848–1931), art collector from New York City
 Tom Clarke (Irish republican) (1857–1916), revolutionary leader involved in the 1916 Easter Rising
 Thomas Shields Clarke (1860–1920), American artist
 Tom Clarke (writer) (1918–1993), British television writer
 Thomas Clarke (professor) (fl. 2000s), British professor
 Thomas Clarke (bushranger) (c. 1840–1867), Australian bushranger

Characters
 Tom Clarke (Taken), a fictional character in the TV series Taken played by Ryan Hurst
 Thomas Clarke, character in Wizards vs Aliens

See also
 Thomas Clark (disambiguation)
 Tom Clark (disambiguation)
 Thomas Clerk (disambiguation)
 Thomas Clerke (disambiguation)